NGC 530, also known as IC 106, is a lenticular galaxy in the constellation Cetus. It is approximately 226 million light years from the Milky Way and has a diameter of around 100,000 light years. The object was discovered on November 20, 1886 by the American astronomer Lewis A. Swift, who listed it as NGC 530, and rediscovered on November 16, 1887 by Guillaume Bigourdan, who listed it as IC 106.

See also 
 List of NGC objects (1–1000)

References

External links
 

0530
IC objects
Cetus (constellation)
Barred lenticular galaxies
005210